Chumbi is a historic village in the Chumbi Valley or the Yadong County of the Tibet Autonomous Region of China. It is in the valley of Amo Chu river, where the route from Sikkim's Cho La pass meets the Amo Chu valley.
The "Chumbi Valley" of the European nomenclature derives its name from the village of Chumbi.
It was the administrative center of the lower Chumbi Valley until the Chinese take-over of Tibet in 1950, after which Yatung became its headquarters. Chumbi is also associated with the Sikkim's royal family, which had a summer palace in the village.

History 
The Chumbi Valley was originally part of the Lepcha territory.
In the 13th or 14th century, it began to be colonised by Khampas from the Kham region of Tibet.
A Minyak prince called Khye Bumsa is said to have settled in Chumbi and established a small kingdom. He later built an alliance with the Lepchas in present-day Sikkim and expanded into that region. The ruins of the house built by Khye Bumsa were reportedly present in the Chumbi village till the end of the 19th century.

The lower Chumbi valley appears to have been under the control of the Lepchas till the time of the Fifth Dalai Lama. A Lepcha chieftain called Gaeboo Achyok (Gyalpo Ajok) based at Damsang (in the present day Kalimpong district) faced invasions from the Bhutanese and obtained Dalai Lama's assistance. The Bhutanese captured and executed Achyok, after which the Tibetans continued to fight the Bhutanese. The end result of these conflicts is not clearly documented, but the Bhutanese were evicted from the lower Chumbi Valley and its control passed to the Sikkimese and Tibetans in some form.

The Sikkim Chogyals constructed a palace at Chumbi during the reign of Chakdor Namgyal, who is said to have received the lower Chumbi valley as an estate from the Tibetan government. It came to be used as a regular summer residence of the Chogyals since 1780. The Chogyals regarded the people of the lower Chumbi Valley as their subjects until 1959, irrespective of the prevailing official boundaries.

Geography 
The village of Chumbi is roughly in the centre of the stretch of Amo Chu valley between Yatung and Rinchengang. The road from the Cho La pass on the Sikkim border arrives here. On the Sikkimese side of the pass, there was a direct road to Tumlong, the capital of Sikkim and the seat of its royalty in the 18th and 19th centuries.

Further downstream are the twin villages of Chema and Pipitang, where the route from the Nathu La pass arrives, and Rinchengang, which receives the route from the Jelep La pass.

Notes

References

Bibliography 
 
 
 
 
 
 
 
 
 
 
 
 
 
 
 

Populated places in Shigatse
Yadong County